L’amore fa male is a 2011 Italian film. It was directed by Mirca Viola. The screenplay was written by Mirca Viola and Cinzia Panzettini. The film stars Stefania Rocca, Paolo Briguglia and Nicole Grimaudo.

Plot 
Germana is an unlucky, untalented aspiring actress, a somewhat inconsiderate mother and the mistress of a wealthy lawyer who supports her financially.  Elisabetta, her neighbor, conversely is a successful doctor who is too closed in her schemes to notice that her husband is homosexual until she is left alone with many questions.

When Gianmarco, a family man in a job crisis, saves Germana's daughter from an accident, sparks fly between them. Too bad she does not know that he is married and is friends with Elisabetta. Fate confronts them with reality when, during a vacation in Sicily, they all come together, forcing them to confront each other.

Cast
Claudio Bigagli
Paolo Briguglia as Gianmarco
Stefano Dionisi as Aldo
Diane Fleri as Antonia
Nicole Grimaudo as Elisabetta
Stefania Rocca as Germana

See also   
 List of Italian films of 2011

References

External links

L’amore fa male, movie of almost-Miss Italian Mirca Viola, presented. Interviews at Coming Soon. In Italian.

Italian drama films
2011 drama films
2011 films
2010s Italian-language films
2010s Italian films